Hornaltica is a genus of flea beetles in the family Chrysomelidae. There is only one described species, H. bicolorata, found in North America.

References

Further reading

 
 

Alticini
Monotypic Chrysomelidae genera
Articles created by Qbugbot
Taxa named by Herbert Spencer Barber